The 2019–20 PSA World Tour is the international squash tour organised circuit organized by the Professional Squash Association (PSA) for the 2019–20 squash season. It's the 5th PSA season since the merger of PSA and WSA associations in 2015.

The most important tournaments in the series are the Men's and Women's PSA World Championship. The tour also features two circuits of regular events - PSA World Tour (formerly PSA World Series), which feature the highest prize money and the best fields; and PSA Challenger Tour with prize money ranging $5,500–$30,000. In the middle of the year, the PSA World Tour tour is concluded by the Men's and Women's PSA World Tour Finals in Cairo, the season-ending championships for the top 8 rated players from World Tour level tournaments.

Overview

PSA World Tour changes
Starting in August 2018, PSA revamped its professional tour structure in two individual circuits; PSA World Tour and PSA Challenger Tour.

PSA World Tour (formerly PSA World Series) will comprise most important tournaments in prize money ($50,000–$1,000,000) for more experienced and higher-ranked players, including PSA World Championships and PSA World Tour Finals, labelled as following:
PSA World Tour Platinum — 48-player draws — $180,500
PSA World Tour Gold — 24-player draws — $100,000
PSA World Tour Silver — 24-player draws — $73,500
PSA World Tour Bronze — 24-player draws — $51,250

PSA Challenger Tour tournaments will offer a $6,000–$30,000 prize-money, ideal circuit for less-experienced and upcoming players, that will include the following tiers:
PSA Challenger Tour 30 — $30,000
PSA Challenger Tour 20 — $20,000
PSA Challenger Tour 10 — $12,000
PSA Challenger Tour 5 — $6,000

Further, PSA will implement some rule changes like the removing of qualification rounds among others. Also PSA will grant 7 World Championship wildcards for winners of selected PSA Challenger Tour chosen by PSA. Additionally, PSA and WSF will jointly manage PSA Satellite Tour, a circuit for amateur or junior players who aim to become professionals.

Prize money/ranking points breakdown
PSA World Tour events also have a separate World Tour ranking. Points for this are calculated on a cumulative basis after each World Tour event. The top eight players at the end of the calendar year are then eligible to play in the PSA World Tour Finals.

Ranking points vary according to tournament tier being awarded as follows:

World Tour halts
In mid-March 2020, due to COVID-19 pandemic, The Professional Squash Association was forced to suspend the PSA Tour (World Tour, Challenger Tour and WSF & PSA Satellite Tour) until May. Then, the Tour suspension experienced new extensions first until July and later until September.

PSA Tour return is expected to September 2020.

Calendar

Key

August

(QE): 2019–20 PSA World Squash Championships Qualifying Event.

September

October

November

December

January

February

March

April

May

June

July

PSA World Tour Finals
Due to play on 15–20 June 2020, the World Tour Finals were postponed to 28 September–3 October due to COVID-19 pandemic.

Statistical information

The players/nations are sorted by:
 Total number of titles;
 Cumulated importance of those titles;
 Alphabetical order (by family names for players).

Key

Titles won by player (men's)

Titles won by nation (men's)

Titles won by player (women's)

Titles won by nation (women's)

World Championship qualifiers
Winners of a select group of PSA Challenger Tour tournaments chosen by PSA receive a wildcard for the Men's and Women's World Championships. The qualified players were:

World and Continental championships

National championships
These are the winners of the most relevant  national squash championships.

Retirements
Following is a list of notable players (winners of a main tour title, and/or part of the PSA Men's World Rankings and Women's World Rankings top 30 for at least one month) who announced their retirement from professional squash, became inactive, or were permanently banned from playing, during the 2019–20 season:

 Annie Au
 Leo Au
 Joey Chan
 Samantha Cornett
 Ryan Cuskelly
 Raneem El Weleily 
 Victoria Lust
 Omar Abdel Meguid
 Cameron Pilley
 Chris Simpson

See also
2019–20 PSA World Tour Finals
2020 Men's PSA World Tour Finals
2020 Women's PSA World Tour Finals

References

External links
 PSA World Tour

PSA World Tour seasons
2019 in squash
2020 in squash